Ahmed Sharif  (13 February 1921 – 24 February 1999) was an educationist, philosopher, critic, writer and scholar of medieval Bengali literature. He is recognized as one of the most outspoken atheist and radical thinkers of Bangladesh.

Background 
Sharif was born on 13 February 1921 in Patiya, Chittagong District. His father was Abdul Aziz and his uncle was Abdul Karim Sahitya Bisharad, a prominent historian of Bangla literature. He did his master's and Ph.D. degrees in Bengali literature from the University of Dhaka, in 1944 and 1967 respectively. From 1945 to 1949, he taught at Laksham Nawab Faizunnessa College and later on at Feni College. From July 1949 to 17 December 1950 he worked as programme assistant at the Dhaka station of Radio Pakistan. Finally, on 18 December 1950, he joined as research assistant in the Bengali Department, University of Dhaka and retired as chairman and professor in 1983.

During his time at the University of Dhaka he was elected a member of the Senate, Syndicate, and the president of the Teachers Association and the University Teachers Club. Sharif remained the only person who was elected the dean of the Faculty of Arts for three consecutive terms. After his retirement from the Dhaka University, he was offered to join as first "Kazi Nazrul Islam Professor" at the University of Chittagong, where he served from 1984 to 1986.

He was an active member of the Committee for Civil Liberties and Legal Aid, which was established in March 1974 to protect opposition politicians and members of civil society whose civil liberties were being violated by the Awami League government. He and Lt. Colonel Kazi Nuruzzaman led the Muktijuddha Chetana Bikash Kendra (Centre for the Development of the Spirit of the Liberation War), a group of left-leaning intellectuals who spoke out against the dictatorship of Hussain Muhammad Ershad.

Views 
Sharif taught about medieval Bengali literature and regularly gave insights into the history of Bengal, the Bangladesh Liberation War and Rabindranath Tagore.

Awards
 Bangla Academy Literary Award (1968)
 Dawood Prize for Literature
 Ekushey Padak (1991)

Death 
Sharif died on 24 February 1999, in Dhaka.

References

1921 births
1999 deaths
People from Chittagong
Bangladeshi male writers
Bangladeshi secularists
Bangladeshi atheists
Chittagong College alumni
Academic staff of the University of Dhaka
Recipients of the Ekushey Padak
Recipients of Bangla Academy Award
Bangladeshi former Muslims
Writers from Chittagong
University of Dhaka alumni